Gyzylarbat  District (from 1999 until late 2022 Serdar District) is a district of Balkan Province in Turkmenistan. The administrative center of the district is the city of Gyzylarbat. It was the old Iranian district of Farava (Paraw). The name Gyzylarbat was restored by decree of the Turkmen parliament on 9 November 2022.

References

Districts of Turkmenistan
Balkan Region